The 1996 North American Touring Car Championship was the first season of the North American Touring Car Championship.  The series was organized by CART, and ran to Super Touring regulations.  16 rounds at 8 race meetings were organized, all but two (Lime Rock and Trois-Rivières) supporting the CART IndyCar World Series.

Teams and drivers

Calendar
The calendar initially included an event at Charlotte Motor Speedway on May 20, as a support race for NASCAR's The Winston.  By December 14, 1995, Charlotte was dropped from the calendar, replaced with a doubleheader at the Molson Indy Vancouver.  The Portland event was added to the schedule on April 15.

Championship standings

Drivers Championship

Manufacturers Championship

See also
1996 IndyCar season
1996 Indy Lights season
1996 Formula Atlantic season

References

External links
Results & points
http://www.driverdb.com/standings/639-1996/

North American Touring Car Championship
Seasons in touring car racing
North American Touring Car Championship
North American Touring Car Championship